Mugsy's Revenge is a strategy and management computer game for the ZX Spectrum, Commodore 64 and Amstrad CPC that was released in 1986. It is effectively a sequel to the earlier Mugsy by the same publisher, and has many of the same features, in both design, and setting.

Gameplay 
The player takes the role of 'Mugsy', a gangster who has just been released from prison. The game begins in 1919, and the aim of the game is for Mugsy to make a fortune from the bootleg smuggling business, which has been generated as a result of prohibition. In each 'turn' of the game, which represents one year, decisions must be made about how much illegal alcohol to buy, which staff to assign to which activity, and how much money to spend on bribing law enforcement. Surviving for ten years means that the game ends, with the repeal of prohibition.

The game had a similar theme and visual style to Mugsy, in that it featured strong, colorful graphics in a similar style to comic books, with information presented to the player in the form of dialogue between on-screen characters, such as Mugsy himself, and an un-named assistant. At each decision point, the player enters text into a dialogue box.

There was also a mini-game arcade element. This is triggered in the event that one of Mugsy's rivals orders a contract killing on him. When this happens, the player controls Mugsy directly, and must shoot the assassins who are sent after him before Mugsy gets shot too many times himself.

Controls
Only a keyboard could be used for the majority of the gameplay, since most of the user input was by text. A joystick could be used for the arcade sequence.

Release
The game was released at a price of £8.95 for the Commodore and Amstrad versions, and £7.95 for the Spectrum.

Reception 
Reviews of the Spectrum edition were generally warm, and many compared it unfavourably to the original Mugsy. While many reviews were positive about the graphics, gameplay was seen as repetitive. Scores out of ten from magazines were 7 (Your Sinclair), 6 (Crash) and 8 from Sinclair User.

The Commodore reviews were less positive, ranging from 2 out of 10 from Your Commodore, to 6 out of 10 in Computer and Video Games.

See also 
 History of video games

References 

1986 video games
Video games developed in the United Kingdom
ZX Spectrum games
Commodore 64 games
Amstrad CPC games
Business simulation games
Organized crime video games